Rare Paul Gonsalves Sextet in Europe is an album recorded in 1963 by Paul Gonsalves.

Track listing 
Robins Nest 
Angel Eyes 
Blues 
Blue and Sentimental 
Mr. Gentle and Mr. Cool 
I Can't Get Started 
Just Friends

Performers
Paul Gonsalves - Tenor Saxophone 
Ray Nance - Trumpet / Violin / Vocal 
Rolf Ericson - Trumpet 
Otto Francker - Piano / Organ 
Jimmy Woode - Bass 
Sam Woodyard - drums

1963 albums
Paul Gonsalves albums